Amelia Mustone (July 16, 1928 – July 7, 2019) was an American politician who served in the Connecticut Senate from the 13th district from 1979 to 1995.

She died on July 7, 2019, in Meriden, Connecticut at age 90.

References

1928 births
2019 deaths
Democratic Party Connecticut state senators